Austria competed at the 1960 Winter Olympics in Squaw Valley, United States.

As Innsbruck would be the host city for the following Winter Olympics, an Austrian segment was performed at the closing ceremony.

Medalists

Alpine skiing

Men

Women

Figure skating

Men

Women

Pairs

Nordic combined 

Events:
 normal hill ski jumping (Three jumps, best two counted and shown here.)
 15 km cross-country skiing

Ski jumping

Speed skating

Men

References
Official Olympic Reports
International Olympic Committee results database
 Olympic Winter Games 1960, full results by sports-reference.com

Nations at the 1960 Winter Olympics
1960
Winter Olympics